Chris Vincent may refer to:

Chris Vincent (American football) (born 1981), American football running back
Chris Vincent (motorcycle sidecar racer) (1935–2021), British motorcycle sidecar road racer